Virginius Dabney (February 2, 1878 – January 17, 1942) was an American college football player and coach. He served as the head coach at Tulane University in 1902.

Playing career

Dabney attended the University of Virginia, where he played on the football team as a prominent halfback from 1896 to 1900. He was a member of Delta Kappa Epsilon.

1900

Dabney was selected All-Southern by Caspar Whitney in Outing. Virginia had a claim to a Southern championship. The Cavaliers defeated Sewanee 17 to 5 to give the school its first loss since 1897. Dabney ran for two touchdowns that game. An account of one of those reads "Dabney ran twenty yards for a touchdown, the gain being largely due to the splendid interference led by Walker and Haskel.

Coaching career

1902
In 1902, he was the head coach of the football team at Tulane University. The Olive and Blue amassed a 1–4–2 record that season.

Later life
Dabney was later an otolaryngologist. He died in 1942.

Head coaching record

References

External  links
 

1878 births
1942 deaths
19th-century players of American football
American football halfbacks
Tulane Green Wave football coaches
Virginia Cavaliers football players
All-Southern college football players
American otolaryngologists
Sportspeople from Charlottesville, Virginia